John Locke Mercer (January 22, 1892 – December 22, 1982) was a Major League Baseball first baseman. Mercer played in one game for the St. Louis Cardinals on June 25, .

External links

1892 births
1982 deaths
Major League Baseball first basemen
St. Louis Cardinals players
Baseball players from Louisiana